Daniel J. Kelly (born March 10, 1989 in Fairfax, Virginia) is an American professional poker player from Potomac, Maryland who won his first bracelet at the 2010 World Series of Poker in the $25,000 No Limit Hold'em Six Handed event, earning $1,315,518. his second came at the 2014 WSOP in the $1,500 Limit Hold'em event.

Kelly graduated from Villanova University in 2011 with a degree in mechanical engineering. He was also a sponsored professional poker player as one of Doyle's 10 at the online card-room Doyles Room.

World Series of Poker 
At the 2010 World Series of Poker, Kelly won his first WSOP bracelet in the $25,000 No Limit Hold'em Six Handed event, collecting $1,315,518 in prizemoney. He defeated Shawn Buchanan in a heads up battle after surviving a final table which included Frank Kassela (3rd), Jason Somerville (4th), Mikael Thuritz (5th) and Eugene Katchalov (6th). Kelly also has three other cashes at the 2010 World Series of Poker in the first year he was of legal age to play. Dan Kelly finished 4th in the 2013 millionaire maker at the world series of poker for $325,000.

World Series of Poker bracelets

World Poker Tour
Dan made his first ever WPT money finish in the WPT Spanish Championship in 2008, finishing in 24th place and earned himself €7,580. His made the final table in his second WPT cash at the L.A. Poker Classic in 2011, finishing 3rd place for $521,770.

As of 2014, his total live tournament winnings exceed $3,100,000.

Online poker

In a July 2010 article by Andrew Feldman of ESPN, wrote "Dan "djk123" Kelly had been one of the more-hyped rookies heading into the WSOP, and his performance in this event simply proved all the critics right."

In an interview in Bluff Magazine by Ryan Nelson, the World Series of Poker Europe Main Event winner Annette "Annette_15" Obrestad was asked who she would least like to have position on her, she mention four players, Sorel "Imper1um" Mizzi, Chad "lilholdem954" Batista, Isaac "westmenloAA" Baron and Dan "djk123" Kelly, she said of Kelly in particular "djk123 always owns me!"

In an article in ESPN poker about 2010 World Series of Poker where Kelly won he first bracelet, Gary Wise wrote "Jason Somerville described him prior to the final table as "One of the greatest tournament players in history," a sentiment that seems to be shared by many in the online community."

Some of Kelly's online poker tournament achievements include:

In the PokerStars $215 Sunday Warm-Up, an online poker tournament that began on March 28, 2010, Kelly finished second for $109,300.30

In June 2009, he placed second in the PokerStars' $530 "Sunday 500" tournament, earning $68,900.

World Championship of Online Poker 
Kelly known on PokerStars by the screen name "djk123" has played several events at the World Championship of Online Poker (WCOOP), He cashed a total of 11 times in the 2009 WCOOP alone while winning two titles that year, one in the $215 Razz event earning $53,410.01 and the other in the $10,300 H.O.R.S.E. event, earning $252,350. Also in 2009 he made the final table at the $5,200 No Limit Hold'em Main Event along with the eventual winner Yevgeniy "Jovial Gent" Timoshenko, Kelly finished in fourth for $643,200 and due to his overall achievements, he won the 2009 WCOOP Player of the Year award.

At the 2011 WCOOP Kelly playing out of the country of Malta won his third WCOOP title in Event 37, the $109 8-Game for $23,529. This was the first WCOOP held by PokerStars after the events of Black Friday 2011.

At the 2012 WCOOP Kelly playing out of the country of Costa Rica won a record fourth WCOOP title in Event 36: $215 No-Limit Hold'em w/Rebuys for $138,355.

Full Tilt Online Poker Series 
Kelly is known on Full Tilt Poker as "imabigkidnow", and on the site he won a Full Tilt Online Poker Series title in the FTOPS X Event #14 $216 No Limit Hold ‘em Turbo, earning $104,869.80. In the next series in the FTOPS XI Event #17 No Limit Hold'em 6-max with Rebuy, he came in third, earning $116,661.60.

References

External links
CardPlayer - Interview With Daniel 'djk123' Kelly
PokerVerdict.com Player Focus: djk123
CalvinAyre.Com - Dan Kelly's Introduction into Online Poker - At Age 15

1989 births
Living people
World Series of Poker bracelet winners
American poker players
People from Potomac, Maryland